Heat Lightning is a 1934 Pre-Code drama film starring Aline MacMahon, Ann Dvorak, and Preston Foster. It is based on the play of the same name by Leon Abrams and George Abbott.

The movie was one of the last to be released before the Motion Picture Production Code was rigorously enforced. According to Robert Osborne of Turner Classic Movies, two months after its release, it was condemned by the Catholic Legion of Decency. A print is held at the Library of Congress.

Plot
Olga (Aline MacMahon) runs an isolated gas station and restaurant in the stifling hot desert somewhere in the American Southwest with her discontented younger sister Myra (Ann Dvorak). The sisters clash when Olga forbids Myra from going to a dance with her boyfriend Steve.

That same day, chance sends Olga an unexpected and unwelcome customer, ex-boyfriend George (Preston Foster). Unbeknownst to her, George and his nervous partner Jeff (Lyle Talbot) are on the run from the police after a botched robbery that left two men dead, killed by George. Initially intent on sneaking across the border to Mexico, George decides to stay awhile when two jewelry-laden, wealthy divorcees, "Feathers" Tifton (Glenda Farrell) and "Tinkle" Ashton-Ashley (Ruth Donnelly), are stranded there for the night by their long-suffering chauffeur Frank (Frank McHugh).

Frank pretends there is something wrong with their car so he can have a rest from driving. Olga, the mechanic, plays along. When Mrs. Ashton-Ashley becomes worried about a large Mexican family spending the night nearby, Olga offers to store the women's valuables in her safe.

George manipulates Olga's feelings, reviving the love she once felt for him. Though she knows better and tries to resist, she eventually succumbs to his charms, and they sleep together. This gives Myra the opportunity to sneak away to meet Steve. Myra returns later that night, terribly upset after having been taken advantage of by Steve. When Olga starts berating her for going off with her boyfriend, she responds by revealing she saw George leaving Olga's bedroom. The two miserable women then comfort each other.

Meanwhile, George orders Jeff to open the safe. Jeff is reluctant to cause trouble for Olga, but gives in when George pulls out his gun. Olga overhears George say he slept with her just to set up the theft. She gets her pistol and shoots him. As he lies dying, he apologizes to her. Olga lets Jeff go.

Cast
 Aline MacMahon as Olga
 Ann Dvorak as Myra
 Preston Foster as George
 Lyle Talbot as Jeff
 Glenda Farrell as Mrs. "Feathers" Tifton
 Frank McHugh as Frank, the Chauffeur
 Ruth Donnelly as Mrs. "Tinkle" Ashton-Ashley
 Theodore Newton as Steve Laird
 Willard Robertson as Everett Marshall
 Harry C. Bradley as "Popsy"
 James Durkin as The Sheriff
 Jane Darwell as Gladys, The Wife
 Edgar Kennedy as Herbert, The Husband 
 Muriel Evans as Blonde Cutie

1941 remake
Using Abbott and Abrams' play for Heat Lightning, Allen Rivkin, Charles Kenyon, and Kenneth Gamet wrote the screenplay for Warner Bros. remake Highway West (1941).

References

External links

 
 
 
 
 Heat Lightning review, obscureclassics.wordpress.com; accessed June 27, 2017.

1934 films
American black-and-white films
American films based on plays
Films directed by Mervyn LeRoy
1930s English-language films
Warner Bros. films
Films produced by Samuel Bischoff
American drama films
1934 drama films
1930s American films